This is a list of international airports by country. These are airports which are typically equipped with customs and immigration facilities to handle international flights to and from other nations.

Passenger Roles (2011–2020) 
 Large (18,500,000+ Annual Passengers)
 Medium (3,500,000–18,499,999 Annual Passengers)
 Small (500,000–3,499,999 Annual Passengers)
 Non-Hub (10,000–499,999 Annual Passengers)
 Reliever (1–9,999 Annual Passengers)

Africa

Northern Africa

Algeria

Egypt

Libya

Morocco

Sudan

Tunisia

Western Africa

Benin

Burkina Faso

Cape Verde

Côte d'Ivoire

The Gambia

Ghana

Guinea

Guinea-Bissau

Liberia

Mali

Mauritania

Niger

Nigeria

Saint Helena, Ascension and Tristan da Cunha

Senegal

Sierra Leone

Togo

Central Africa

Angola

Cameroon

Central African Republic

Chad

Democratic Republic of the Congo

Republic of the Congo

Equatorial Guinea

Gabon

São Tomé and Príncipe

Southern Africa

Botswana

Eswatini

Lesotho

Namibia

South Africa

Eastern Africa

Burundi

Comoros

Djibouti

Eritrea

Ethiopia

Kenya

Madagascar

Malawi

Mauritius

Mayotte

Mozambique

Réunion

Rwanda

Seychelles

Somalia

South Sudan

Tanzania

Uganda

Zambia

Zimbabwe

Americas

Caribbean

Anguilla

Antigua and Barbuda

Aruba

Bahamas

Barbados

British Virgin Islands

Caribbean Netherlands

Cayman Islands

Cuba

Curaçao

Dominica

Dominican Republic

Grenada

Guadeloupe

Haiti

Jamaica

Martinique

Montserrat

Puerto Rico

Saint Barthélemy

Saint Kitts and Nevis

Saint Lucia

Saint Vincent and the Grenadines

Sint Maarten

Trinidad and Tobago

Turks and Caicos Islands

U.S. Virgin Islands

Central America

Belize

Costa Rica

El Salvador

Guatemala

Honduras

Nicaragua

Panama

North America

Bermuda

Canada

Greenland

Mexico

Saint Pierre and Miquelon

United States

**Reagan National does offer limited international flights to destinations such as Canada and Bermuda, but lacks an International Passenger Handling Facility operated by U.S. Customs. Therefore, it does serve international flights but does not meet the full definition of an international airport as it does not have the capability to process international passengers in a CBP processing facility.

South America

Argentina

Bolivia

Brazil

Chile

Colombia

Ecuador

Falkland Islands

French Guiana

Guyana

Paraguay

Peru

Suriname

Uruguay

Venezuela

Asia

Central Asia

Kazakhstan

Kyrgyzstan

Tajikistan

Turkmenistan

Uzbekistan

East Asia

North Korea

Japan

Mongolia

China

Hong Kong

Macau

Taiwan

South Korea

South Asia

Bangladesh

Bhutan

India

Maldives

Nepal

Pakistan

Sri Lanka

Southeast Asia

Brunei

Cambodia

East Timor

Indonesia

Laos

Malaysia

Myanmar (Burma)

Philippines

Singapore

Thailand

Vietnam

Southwest Asia and the Middle East

Afghanistan

Bahrain

Iran

Iraq

Israel

Jordan

Kuwait

Lebanon

Oman

Qatar

Saudi Arabia

Syria

United Arab Emirates

Yemen

Europe

United Kingdom

England and Wales

Scotland

Northern Ireland

Western Europe

Belgium

France

Gibraltar

Guernsey

Jersey

Ireland

Isle of Man

Luxembourg

Netherlands

Central Europe

Austria

Czech Republic

Germany

Hungary

Slovakia

Switzerland

Poland

Southern Europe

Croatia

Cyprus

Greece

Italy

Malta

Portugal

Slovenia

Spain

Eastern Europe

Albania

Armenia

Azerbaijan

Belarus

Bosnia and Herzegovina

Bulgaria

Georgia

Kosovo

Moldova

Romania

Montenegro

North Macedonia

Russia

Serbia

Turkiye

Ukraine

Nordic region

Denmark

Estonia

Faroe Islands

Finland

Iceland

Latvia

Lithuania

Norway

Sweden

Oceania

American Samoa

Australia

Christmas Island

Cocos (Keeling) Islands

Cook Islands

Easter Island

Fiji

French Polynesia

Guam

Kiribati

Marshall Islands

Federated States of Micronesia

Nauru

New Caledonia

New Zealand

Norfolk Island

Northern Mariana Islands

Niue

Palau

Papua New Guinea

Samoa

Solomon Islands

Tonga

Tuvalu

Vanuatu

Wallis and Futuna

See also
International airport

References
2. http://www.transtats.bts.gov/Data_Elements.aspx
 
 
International Passenger Traffic, Airports Council International

Lists of airports
Airports